Berbere ( bärbäre,  bärbärä) is a spice mixture whose constituent elements usually include chili peppers, coriander, garlic, ginger, Ethiopian holy basil (besobela) seeds, korarima, rue, ajwain or radhuni, nigella, and fenugreek. It is a key ingredient in the cuisines of Ethiopia and Eritrea.    Berbere also refers to chili pepper itself.

Berbere sometimes encompasses herbs and spices that are less well known internationally. These include both cultivated plants and those that grow wild in Ethiopia, such as korarima (Aframomum corrorima).

See also
 Mitmita, another Ethiopian spice mixture
 Piri piri
 List of Ethiopian dishes and foods
 Seasoning

References

External links

 Berbere recipe from RecipeLand.com
 Image of packaged berbere

Eritrean cuisine
Ethiopian cuisine
Herb and spice mixtures